Kill vehicle is a term from space weapon development and science fiction which denotes either a kinetic projectile or an explosive warhead supposed to impact on or (in the case of the warhead) near a target. It is the final missile stage of an interceptor weapon.

See also
Anti-satellite weapon
Exoatmospheric Kill Vehicle
Ground-Based Midcourse Defense 
Kinetic kill vehicle
Multiple Kill Vehicle

Space weapons